Obedience to Authority: An Experimental View is a 1974 book by social psychologist Stanley Milgram concerning a series of experiments on obedience to authority figures he conducted in the early 1960s. This book provides an in-depth look into his methods, theories and conclusions.

Background

Between 1961 and 1965, Milgram carried out a series of experiments at Yale University in which human subjects were instructed to administer what they thought were progressively more painful electric shocks to another human being to determine to what extent people would obey orders even when they knew them to be painful and immoral. The experiments came under heavy criticism at the time but were ultimately vindicated by the scientific community.

Milgram's experiments on obedience to authority are considered among the most important psychological studies of this century. Perhaps because of the enduring significance of the findings—the surprising ease with which ordinary persons can be commanded to act destructively against an innocent individual by a legitimate authority—it continues to claim the attention of psychologists and other social scientists, as well as the general public.

In 1963, Milgram published The Behavioral Study of Obedience in the Journal of Abnormal and Social Psychology, which included a detailed record of the controversial electric shock experiment. There were two stunning findings. The first was the extraordinary strength of the obedience and the second was the tension such experiment brought to participants. Nevertheless, all participants reached an electric shock of 300 or more.

Contents
The Dilemma of Obedience
Methodology of Inquiry
Expected Behavior
Closeness of the Victim
Individuals Confront Authority
Further Variations and Control
Individuals Confront Authority II
Role Permutations
Group Effects
Why Obedience?—An Analysis
The Process of Obedience: Applying the Analysis to the Experiment
Strain and Disobedience
An Alternative Theory: Is Aggression the Key?
Problems of Method
Epilogue
Appendix I: Problems of Ethics in Research
Appendix II: Patterns Among Individuals

Editions
 Milgram, S. (1974), Obedience to Authority: An Experimental View, London: Tavistock Publications.
 Milgram, S. (2005), Obedience to Authority: An Experimental View, Pinter & Martin Ltd.; New edition, paperback: 240 pages  
 Milgram, S. (2009), Obedience to Authority: An Experimental View, Harper Perennial Modern Classics; Reprint edition, paperback: 256 pages

References

1974 non-fiction books
Moral psychology books